Gentlemen is a 2014 romantic thriller film directed by Mikael Marcimain, based on the novel of the same name by Klas Östergren. The film was nominated for the 2015 Nordic Council Film Prize.

Cast

David Dencik as Henry Morgan
Ruth Vega Fernandez as Maud
Sverrir Gudnason as Leo Morgan
David Fukamachi Regnfors as Klas Östergren
Pernilla August as Greta
Peter Carlberg as Birger
Magnus Krepper as Stene Forman
Magnus Roosmann as Jazzbaronen
Sven Nordin as Franzén
Boman Oscarsson as Wilhelm Sterner
Amanda Ooms as Hälardrottningen
Staffan Göthe as Hogarth
Sonja Richter as Tove
Liv Mjönes as Vivi
Louise Peterhoff as Nina
Anders Beckman as Knegarn
Per Myrberg as Sailorn
Lars Green as Willis
Björn Andersson as Conny
Dag Malmberg as Cigarrhandlare
Christopher Wagelin as Verner
Jennie Silfverhjelm as Kerstin
Per Burell as Jansen
Lil Terselius as Maud's mother

Production
Gentlemen was shot in Stockholm, Scania, Vilnius, Paris and Jutland.

References

External links
 
 

2010s historical romance films
2010s romantic thriller films
2014 films
Films based on Swedish novels
Films directed by Mikael Marcimain
Films set in the 1960s
Films set in the 1970s
Films set in Stockholm
Films shot in Denmark
Films shot in Paris
Films shot in Lithuania
Films shot in Stockholm
Norwegian historical films
Norwegian thriller films
Swedish historical films
Swedish romance films
Swedish thriller films
2010s Swedish-language films
2010s Swedish films